A sewing machine needle is a specialized needle for use in a sewing machine.  A sewing machine needle consists of:
 shank - clamped by the sewing machine's needle holder
 shoulder - where the thick shank tapers down to the shaft
 shaft - a length suitable for driving the eye and thread through the material and down to the bobbin
 groove - cut in the front of the shaft to allow the thread to lie more closely to the needle as it passes through the fabric
 scarf - provides extra room for the hook or shuttle to pass close by
 eye - carries the thread
 point - penetrates the material by either parting the threads or cutting a hole in the fabric

Domestic sewing machines, designed for use in homes as opposed to commercial sewing operations, use a common needle type (including a standardized length, as well as shank shape and diameter) referred to as "Groz-Beckert 130 / 705," "HAx1" or "15x1" needles. Needles labeled as "universal" needles are of this type and are generally the type of needles found in retail sewing supply shops. The 15x1 needle is available in different standardized shaft diameters suitable for sewing different fabrics (see the section on Size codes below).

For commercial/industrial sewing machines, there are several proprietary sizes and types of needles which are not mentioned in this article.

Construction

The majority of sewing machine needles are made of various grades of hardened steel coated with either nickel or chromium, though certain specialty needles are coated with titanium nitride on top of chromium.  Titanium nitride is a reflective golden-colored ceramic material which reduces abrasion allowing the needle to stay sharper longer and last many times longer than other varieties.  The titanium does not make the needle any stronger in regards to bending, however, and such needles will bend and snap just as easily as any other.

Nickel plating is the least expensive and least durable form of plating.  Chrome plating lasts longer and gives better abrasion resistance.  Titanium nitride on top of chromium is the most expensive and is superior in performance to both chrome and nickel.

Size codes
More than a dozen modern conventions exist for numbering the sizes of sewing machine needles, though only two remain in common use: the American (established and propagated by Singer) and the international system (also called the "European", "number metric" or "NM" system). The European designation, established in 1942, corresponds to the diameter of the needle in hundredths of a millimeter at a non-reinforced point above the scarf. In both cases, a larger number corresponds to a larger, heavier needle.  

Most sewing machine needles will have packaging that gives both of these numbers in its size description — (e.g. as either 100/16 or 16/100).  The length of all sewing machine needles has been standardized and does not require a separate code.

The metric designation is the actual needle diameter in hundredths of a millimeter. The following chart gives a comparison of the two systems:

Types
Most currently manufactured needles are designated according to "type", and fall into the following categories:

Singer number and color codes
Singer colors and numbers its needles with the following system of codes to indicate the needle point type and shaft size:

SVP Worldwide colour codes
The coloured band on some types of Inspira needles indicates the needle type.

Kenmore color codes
Kenmore colors its needles with a different system of color codes which indicate the needle's size:

Schmetz shank colour codes
The coloured top band on some types of Schmetz needles indicates the needle shank types. 

Schmetz needles with a universal needle (shank) have a colored bottom band indicating the (shaft) sizes:

References 

Sewing machines